Moths of the French Southern and Antarctic Lands represent about 10 known moth species. The moths (mostly nocturnal) and butterflies (mostly diurnal) together make up the taxonomic order Lepidoptera.

This is a list of moth species which have been recorded from the French Southern and Antarctic Lands.

Crambidae
Crambus viettellus Błeszyński & Collins, 1962
Nomophila incognita Viette, 1959

Noctuidae
Agrotis ipsilon (Hufnagel, 1766)
Brachypteragrotis patricei Viette, 1959
Heliothis pauliani Viette, 1959

Tineidae
Monopis crocicapitella (Clemens, 1859)
Opogona omoscopa (Meyrick, 1893)
Pringleophaga crozetensis Enderlein, 1905
Pringleophaga kerguelensis Enderlein, 1905

Yponomeutidae
Embryonopsis halticella Eaton, 1875

External links
AfroMoths

French Southern and Antarctic Lands